Annika Lööf (born September 11, 1966) is a Swedish female curler.

Teams

Private life
Her brother Anders is a curler too.

References

External links

Living people
1966 births
Swedish female curlers
World curling champions
Swedish curling champions